Huzhou (Huzhou dialect: ghou² cieu¹) is a prefecture-level city in northern Zhejiang province (Hangzhou–Jiaxing–Huzhou Plain, China). Lying south of the Lake Tai, it borders Jiaxing to the east, Hangzhou to the south, and the provinces of Anhui and Jiangsu to the west and north respectively. As of the 2020 census, its population was 3,367,579 inhabitants, of whom 1,015,937 lived in the built-up (or metro) area made of Wuxing District as Nanxun District is not being conurbated yet.

Location 

Flowing quietly through the city is the Changxing-Huzhou-Shanghai Channel, it is also referred to as the "Eastern Rhine River" for the continuous barge transportation that goes on similarly in the more internationally known Rhine River in Germany.

The State Way 318 passes through Huzhou in an east-west direction and the State Way 104 in a north-south direction; the Nanjing-Huzhou-Hangzhou toll expressway and Shanghai-Jiangsu-Zhejiang-Anhui toll expressway offers convenient access to major areas in the region.

This railway line is part of the "secondary tunnel" in eastern China.

History 

248 BC, Gucheng County was set up by the State of Chu.
222 BC, Qin dynasty, Wucheng County was set up.
266, Kingdom of Wu, set Wuxing Shire, its administrative area including the modern Huzhou prefecture city and Hangzhou, Yixing in modern-day Jiangsu.
602, Sui dynasty, changed the name of Wuxing to Huzhou.
During the Tang dynasty, Huzhou administered 5 counties: Wucheng, Wukang, Changxing, Anji, and Deqing.
At the beginning of the Song dynasty, Gui'an county was divided from the Wucheng county.
During the Qing dynasty, Huzhou administered 7 counties: Wucheng, Guo'an, Wukang, Deqing, Changxing, Anji, and Xiaofeng.
1949, with the establishment of the People's Republic of China, Huzhou town became the seat of government of the First Special District of Zhejiang, administrative area including the modern Huzhou and Jiaxing prefecture cities.
1983, Huzhou prefecture level city was set up.

Climate

Administration

The prefecture-level city of Huzhou administers six county-level divisions, including one economic development zone and two districts and three counties.

These are further divided into 66 township-level divisions, including 50 towns, 10 townships and six subdistricts.

Huzhou Economic Development Zone

Economy 
Huzhou is known as the City of Silk, is one of the Four Capital-cities of Silk in China.
Textiles (especially silk), building materials and agriculture.

Military 
Huzhou is headquarters of the 1st Group Army of the People's Liberation Army, one of the three group armies that comprise the Nanjing Military Region responsible for the defense of China's eastern coast.

Public Spaces 
Lotuses Garden

The Lotus Garden (pinyin "Lianhua Zhuang") is a pleasure garden located 20 minutes south on foot from the city center of Huzhou. The main attractions of the garden include the Lotus flowers that bloom seasonally in the three lake system, a large Koi pond near the north gate, a karaoke veranda and amusement rides for children. Also, barge-themed pedal boats are available for leisure boating. The garden was built in 1924 with stone footpaths and bridges bordering and crossing over the lake system. A variety of structures inhabit the 300 meter squared grounds including two halls, six pavilions, and two inlets, all following the harmonious design of traditional Chinese architecture. Sign posts describe local history and the halls maintain a Tea House where visitors may converse and take a break from the rays of the sun. A particular geological feature worth seeing are the ancient stones transferred from Lake Tai. Families pour into the garden on public vacation days while local people partake in Taiji exercise, or play card and Mahjong games every day, year round. The garden is open during daytime hours and admission is free of charge.

Xiangwang Park
Xiangwang Park (Southwest Gate Park) is a more recent addition to Huzhou's collection of historical parks. It was built in 2009 and located at Chen Bei Bridge. The park includes the rebuilt wooden gate outpost on top of the original defensive wall. A visitor ship is permanently moored one kilometer west of the historic gate.

Long Island Park
Long Island Park (pinyin "Changdao Gongyuan") is a new park just north of the city center on an island stretching north-south in the middle of Xitiao River. It was built in 2009. The park is open every day. A popular destination for local residents after dinner, the lengthy route becomes something of a promenade for people taking their daily constitutional through the form of a jog or, more commonly, a walk. There is a small golf park, a historical pool, and a garden available to visitors.

Transportation
Huzhou is served by Huzhou railway station, situated to the west of the city. Both conventional and high-speed trains stop at the station.

International relations

Twin towns — Sister cities
Huzhou is twinned with:
 Radom, Poland
 Kalmar County, Sweden
 Cabo Frio, Rio de Janeiro, Brazil

Notable people 
Zhu Zhi (156–224) and Zhu Ran (182–248), military general for the Kingdom of Wu during the Three Kingdoms era of China.
Shen Yue (441–513), prominent scholar of the Liang Dynasty and author of the Book of Song.
Chen Baxian (503–559), founder and Emperor Wu of Chen dynasty during Northern and southern dynasties era.
Lu Yu (733–804), sage of tea, author of the Classic of Tea.
Zhao Mengfu (1254–1322), great calligrapher and high officer in Yuan dynasty.
Guan Daogao (1262 - 1319?), calligrapher and author.
Yu Yue (1821–1906), scholar.
Shen Jiaben (1840–1913), Late Qing Chinese scholar and jurist.
Wu Changshuo (1844–1927), great calligrapher.
Chen Qimei (1878–1916), revolutionary, member of Chinese Tongmenghui. Chen Guofu and Chen Lifu are nephews of Chen Qimei.
Lei Zhen (1897–1979), politician and political analyst of the Republic of China.
Dai Jitao (1891–1949), politician of the Republic of China.
Zhu Jiahua (1893–1963), politician of the Republic of China.
Zhao Jiuzhang (1907–1968), (ancestral roots in Wuxing) meteorologist and physicist.
Qian Sanqiang (1913–1992), scientist in Chinese atomic bomb study; and his father Qian Xuantong (1887–1939), scholar.
Tu Shou'e (1917–2012), scientist and rocket designer.
 ; (1968–2001), fighter pilot who sacrificed himself during the Hainan Island incident in April 2001.

Specialty
Silk:
Huzhou is well known as one of the birthplaces for silk cultivation. In 1958, a great number of silk, silk ribbon and uncarbonized tablets were found in the southern suburbs of Huzhou. Scientists from the Institute of Archaeology measured these silk products carefully and determined the age of the silk to date back 4700 years. Now, these silk pieces have become the greatest treasures of the Zhejiang Silk Museum.
Huzhou silk has many desirable features, such as paleness in color, luster, flexibility, and roundness in shape. As a result, Huzhou silk has been respected and desired for a very long time. The history of Huzhou silk can be uncovered back to the time of the Warring States (474 BC –221 BC). By the time of the Southern and Northern Dynasties (420 AD – 589 AD), Huzhou silk had already been exported to more than ten countries. During the Tang dynasty (618 AD – 907 AD), Huzhou silk was chosen for an imperial tribute, thus marking the first prosperity in silk production. With the establishment of the Ming dynasty (1368 AD – 1644 AD), the residents living near Lake Tai entered the profitable textile industry, resulting in a larger workforce and a refinement of Huzhou silk products. Huzhou silk has won awards at World Fairs, and is desired by clothing and furnishing manufacturers overseas.

""Huzhou ink brush""
Huzhou has a long history of manufacturing ink brushes, and it can be traced back to the Qin Dynasty. Huzhou's ink brush production and manufacture gained prominence in the Ming Dynasty (13th century). Since the late 20th century, Huzhou has been known as the "Hometown of the Ink Brush". Huzhou also holds an annual "Huzhou Ink Brush Festival", and the festival also has some memorial activities dedicated to Meng Tian - the inventor of ink brush pen.
The most famous brush pen workshop in Huzhou could be the Shanlian, thus its brush pens are named Shanlian Hubi in reverence of this workshop.
Shanlian is also a local place name, whose ancient name was Mengxi. Meng Tian made brush pens there. 
Zhou Shenji's Wonton

The now popular Huzhou style Wonton dish is known to be introduced by an ingenious man named Zhouji. It is said that in 1930, Mr. Zhouji saw how profitable Ding Lianfang's roadside restaurant (began in 1878) was by serving a noodle bowl with bean curd dumplings. As a result of this observation, Zhouji also opened a store to compete for the same clients. Soon after, Mr. Zhouji found that his roadside restaurant could not replicate his competitors profit and was forced to close. However, considering what his competitor did not sell, he rethought his plans. He opened a new roadside restaurant called "Zhou Shengji's". Unlike his first venture, this one made a profit. He sold a wonton bowl with flower dumplings filled with various ingredients. The dumplings could have pork, with your choice of mix such as celery, bamboo, or spinach. And Zhou Shenji's cooks continue to be very particular about the quality of dumpling they serve. They select all the raw materials very carefully, such as wheat flower, sesame, sesame oil, wine, sugar, salt and other spices that need to be added to create the flower dumpling shell. Furthermore, Zhouji invented a special process so that dumplings do not break up easily when boiled. Combined with a special sauce, the dumplings have a satisfying taste and thus are a very popular dish.

See also

Huzhou ink brush
Sheraton Huzhou Hot Spring Resort

References

External links

Government website of Huzhou 

 
Cities in Zhejiang
Prefecture-level divisions of Zhejiang
National Forest Cities in China